Tappeh Mowla (also Romanized as Tappeh Mowlā) is a village in Darreh Seydi Rural District, in the Central District of Borujerd County, Lorestan Province, Iran. At the 2006 census, its population was 307, in 80 families.

References 

Towns and villages in Borujerd County